Markus J. Rantala (born 1976 in Vantaa) is a Finnish biologist and evolutionary psychologist who is a university lecturer at the University of Turku. Rantala has a doctorate in both biology and psychology.  he has published 219 scientific articles.

Rantala is a public debater, dealing with themes of human mating and mental health, who is frequently interviewed in the Finnish mainstream media.

In 2019, Rantala's book Masennuksen biologia (The Biology of Depression) was published, in which depression is examined from an evolutionary psychological perspective.

Sources 

Evolutionary psychologists
Evolutionary psychology
Evolutionary biologists
1976 births
Living people
Finnish biologists